The 2004–05 season of the Slovak Second Football League (also known as 2. liga) was the twelfth season of the league since its establishment. It began on 24 July 2004 and ended on 14 June 2005.

League standing

See also
2004–05 Slovak Superliga

External links
 Tables and results at www.liga.cz

2. Liga (Slovakia) seasons
2004–05 in Slovak football
Slovak